Pesab Jeffery Komal (born 20 December 1968) is a Papua New Guinean politician. He has been a People's National Congress member of the National Parliament of Papua New Guinea since 2012, representing the electorate of Nipa-Kutubu Open.

Komal was educated at Puril Community School and Nipa High School. He was a businessman and the chairman of the Nipa Circuit of the United Church prior to entering politics. He was elected to the National Parliament at the 2012 election, defeating long-serving former MP Philemon Embel. He is chairman of the Law and Order Permanent Committee and a member of the Emergency Permanent Committee, the Private Business Permanent Committee, the Public Accounts Permanent Committee, the Public Works Permanent Committee, the Broadcasting of Parliamentary Proceedings Permanent Committee, the HIV/AIDS Advocacy Special Committee and the Lands and Environment Referral Committee.

References

1968 births
Living people
Members of the National Parliament of Papua New Guinea
People's National Congress (Papua New Guinea) politicians